The Andover Center Historic District encompasses the historic town center of Andover, Connecticut.  Centered on the junction of Hebron Road with Center Street and Cider Mill Road, the district includes houses dating to the town's early history, civic buildings including a library and former town hall, and the town's first cemetery.  The district was listed on the National Register of Historic Places in 2003.

Description and history
The central Connecticut town of Andover was established as a separate Congregational parish, mainly out of portions of Hebron and Coventry, in 1748, but was not incorporated until a century later.  The location where its first meeting house was built was near its geographic center, on Hebron Road between Center Street and Boston Hill Road.  The village benefited economically in the early 19th century from the early establishment of a small flaxseed oil mill, and by the establishment of the Hartford-Norwich Turnpike, which ran along portions of Center Street and Hebron Road, and the later routing of a railroad line just north of the village.  Many of the town's commercial and civic functions were relocated to the US 6 corridor in the mid-20th century.

The district includes 60 contributing buildings, 2 contributing sites, and 4 contributing structures. It includes the town's first cemetery (established 1750), and five 18th-century houses, including the Georgian Phelps-Bingham House, built in 1740. Later buildings include the Greek Revival John Bingham House (1840), and the 1833 Greek Revival First Congregational Church.

See also
North Andover Center Historic District, North Andover, Massachusetts
National Register of Historic Places listings in Tolland County, Connecticut

References

Historic districts in Tolland County, Connecticut
Historic districts on the National Register of Historic Places in Connecticut
National Register of Historic Places in Tolland County, Connecticut
British colonial architecture in the United States
Federal architecture in Connecticut